Oenothera laciniata is a species of flowering plant in the evening primrose family known by the common name cutleaf evening primrose. It is native to the eastern United States but it can be found in many other places as an introduced species and sometimes a noxious weed. It is reported from Hawaii, Australia, Britain, France, Korea, Japan, and other areas. This is an annual or short-lived perennial herb producing a spreading stem from a hairy rosette of deeply cut or lobed leaves. Flowers occur in the axils of leaves higher on the stem. Each flower has pale to deep yellow petals up to about 2 centimeters long which fade orange, pink, or red with age. The fruit is a cylindrical capsule up to 5 centimeters in length.

References

External links
Jepson Manual Treatment

Night-blooming plants
laciniata
Flora of North America